Margarethe is a feminine given name, related to Margaret. People bearing the name include:

 Archduchess Margarethe Klementine of Austria (1870-1955), Archduchess of Austria and Princess of Bohemia, Hungary and Tuscany
 Margarethe Arndt-Ober (1885-1971), German operatic contralto
 Margarethe Cammermeyer (born 1942), Washington National Guard colonel honorably discharged for disclosing she was a lesbian
 Maria Margarethe Danzi (1768-1800), German composer and soprano
 Margarethe Faas-Hardegger (1882–1963), Swiss women's rights activist and trade unionist
 Margarethe von Oven (1904-1991), German accomplice in the 20 July plot to assassinate Hitler
 Margarethe von der Saale (1522–1566), German morganatic spouse by bigamy to Philip I, Landgrave of Hesse
 Margarethe Schreinemakers (born 1958), German television presenter, talk show host and journalist
 Margarethe Lenore Selenka (1860-1922),  German zoologist, anthropologist, feminist and pacifist
 Margarethe Siems (1879–1952), German operatic soprano and voice teacher
 Margarethe Stockhausen (1803–1877), opera singer from Alsace
 Margarethe von Trotta (born 1942), German film director

See also
 Margrethe II of Denmark (born 1940), Queen of Denmark

Feminine given names
German feminine given names
Given names derived from gemstones